Bahuarwa is a village in West Champaran district in the Indian state of Bihar.

Demographics
 India census, Bahuarwa had a population of 1025 in 218 households. Males constitute 52.97% of the population and females 47%. Bahuarwa has an average literacy rate of 55.80%, lower than the national average of 74%: male literacy is 62.41%, and female literacy is 37.58%. In Bahuarwa, 20.78% of the population is under 6 years of age.

References

Villages in West Champaran district